Sir Leonard Rogers  (18 January 1868 – 16 September 1962) was a founder member of the Royal Society of Tropical Medicine and Hygiene, and its President from 1933 to 1935.

Biography
Rogers had a wide range of interests in tropical medicine, from the study of kala-azar epidemics to sea snake venoms, but is best known for pioneering the treatment of cholera with hypertonic saline, which has saved a multitude of lives. He also championed Indian chaulmoogra oil as a treatment for Hansen's disease (leprosy).

Rogers was one of the pioneers in setting up the Calcutta School of Tropical Medicine (CSTM) in Calcutta, India. In 1929, Rogers was awarded the Cameron Prize for Therapeutics of the University of Edinburgh.

He was president of the 1919 session of the Indian Science Congress.

Works

 .
 .
 .
 .
 .
 , with Ernest Muir.

References

1868 births
1962 deaths
19th-century English medical doctors
Fellows of the Royal Society
Indian Medical Service officers
People educated at Plymouth College
Founders of Indian schools and colleges
20th-century English medical doctors
British parasitologists
Knights Commander of the Order of the Indian Empire
Presidents of The Asiatic Society
Knights Commander of the Order of the Star of India
Manson medal winners
People from Helston
Presidents of the Royal Society of Tropical Medicine and Hygiene